Chinelo Iyadi (born 2 February 1998) is a Nigerian swimmer who competes for Nigeria internationally. She emerged 44th Place for the women's 50m breaststroke during the World Championships 2019. She also competed in 100m breaststroke, 50m breaststroke women butterfly during the 2016 Confederation of African Swimming Association senior championships in Dakar, Senegal.

Achievements
In 2018 Confederation of African Swimming  Zone 2 Senior Championships, she won gold medal in the 50m breaststroke and 100m women butterfly.

References 

Living people
1998 births
Nigerian female swimmers